Eshan Hilal is a male Indian belly dancer.

He grew up in a Muslim family in Delhi, India. He trained in the classical Indian dance technique, kathak, the folk technique, kaalbelia, and in belly dance. He performs professionally as a belly dancer.

In 2017, he walked the runway at NIFT cultural festival in designs by Devanshi Tuli, Tamanna Mehra, Sonal Bhardwaj and Mansi Dua.

References 

Living people
21st-century Indian dancers
21st-century Indian Muslims
Belly dancers
Indian male dancers
LGBT Muslims
Dancers from Delhi
Year of birth missing (living people)